Ricky Lynn Gregg (born August 22, 1959) is a country music artist of Native American descent. Active between the years of 1992 and 2001, he has recorded three studio albums: two on Capitol/Liberty Records (1992's Ricky Lynn Gregg and 1994's Get a Little Closer) and one on Rowe Music Group (2001's Careful What You Wish For). His first two albums produced three hit singles on the Billboard country music charts, including the No. 36-peaking "If I Had a Cheatin' Heart".

Musical career
Ricky Lynn Gregg was raised in Longview, Texas, and began singing in the church at a very early age. His earliest influences were gospel and country. As a teenager in school Gregg was influenced by rock & roll and formed the "Ricky Lynn Gregg Project" playing in local venues around his hometown. In 1978 Gregg moved to Ft Worth, Texas and began performing as guitarist and singer for a band known as "Savvy" with their debut album "Made In Texas" being released in 1982. Gregg was also a member of Head East between 1984 and 1987. By 1992, Gregg was performing as a solo singer; the same year, he signed to Liberty Records and released his self titled debut album. The album produced a No. 34 single in "If I Had a Cheatin' Heart", a cover of a Mel Street song. Following it were "Can You Feel It" and "Three Nickels and a Dime". In 1993, Billboard ranked him at No. 4 on their list of Top New Country Artists of the Year.

A second album, titled Get a Little Closer, was released on Liberty in 1994, with its title track being the only single. One year later, Gregg's manager, Jimmy Bowen, retired due to thyroid cancer. In 1997, Gregg found another manager, named Eddie Rhines, who helped the singer rebuild his fan base. By 2001, his third album, titled Careful What You Wish For, was released on the then-newly established independent label Rowe Music Group (RMG).

Gregg has also begun a charity called Trail of Hope, which provides clothing for underprivileged Cherokee, Choctaw and Sioux Indians.

Discography

Albums

Singles

Music videos

References

External links
Official website

1959 births
American country bass guitarists
American male bass guitarists
American country singer-songwriters
Living people
Singer-songwriters from Texas
American country harmonica players
Liberty Records artists
Guitarists from Texas
People from Henderson, Texas
20th-century American bass guitarists
Country musicians from Texas
20th-century American male musicians
American male singer-songwriters